Tirumakudalu Chowdiah (1895 – 19 January 1967) was a violin maestro from India in the Carnatic classical tradition.

Early years
Chowdiah, was born in Tirumakudalu Narsipur village on the banks of the river Kaveri near Mysore in a Vokkaliga family. He became a disciple of Mysore Royal Court musician, Ganavisharadha Bidaram Krishnappa in 1910 and underwent a very rigorous and disciplined training until 1918 in the gurukula system.

Career
With his devoted practice,  Chowdiah became a very great violinist. The name Chowdiah and the violin were synonymous with each other.
With Bidaram Krishnappa's encouragement, courage and mastery, Chowdiah, earned fame, affection and respect from all his great contemporaries. All musicians desired to have him as their violin accompanist. It is said that the brilliant vocalist G. N. Balasubramaniam would request sabha secretaries, who wanted to arrange his concert, that they should talk to Chowdiah's first to make sure he is available to accompany on violin. By devoted practice, application, grit and learning,  Chowdiah rose to Himalayan heights in the world of Carnatic music.

As a guru Chowdiah would not sit with his disciples during fixed hours a standard practice in those days. As a guru he taught many of his disciples for about 8–10 years. He would enforce a sense of discipline that required the shishyas wake up early in the morning everyday and practice akara sadhana. His disciples were expected to practice Sarale in six tempos. Only one raga had to be practised in any given month, for up to four hours a day. This kind of practice was the means of developing voice culture and the deep knowledge of swaras (i.e. notes), essential to gain vast vidwath. Disciples had to practice varnams in three tempos and sing them to his satisfaction. This was the discipline that  Chowdiah inherited from his guru,  Bidaram Krishnappa, and he diligently passed on the same to his disciples.

Chowdiah had many disciples. The list included the likes of R. K. Venkatarama Sastry (violin), V. Ramarathnam (vocal), Kandadevi S Alagiriswamy (1925–2000; violin), Palghat Mani Iyer (violin), Chennai V. Sethuramaiah (violin) and others. Later, Ramanujam, Madurai Venugopal, Chinnappa, H. R. Seetharama Shastri and others became disciples of Chowdiah. As a guru  Chowdiah was very affectionate towards his disciples.
Chowdiah was known for his hospitality and he always hosted many musicians when they visited Mysore. He would house them in a house that was located next to his residence in Mysore. He had cooks and servants dedicated to meeting the needs of his guests. He always took care of his personal chores himself and would get really upset if he found any of his students folding his clothes, etc.

He also introduced his disciples to almost all famous musicians of his times and he insisted that, they learn the many nuances of the art of music from them. On his concert tours, he would always take select disciples and gave them additional opportunities to meet the giants of music, and interact with them. He was in great demand and used to be on concert engagements most of the time. After each concert where he accompanied the great masters, he would sit with his disciples, review the concerts and demonstrate the salient points by singing. Whenever his disciples accompanied him on his concert tours, he would make sure that his students were well taken care of, and would work with sabhas to arrange the concerts of his disciples ahead of main concerts and accompany his disciples on violin. The respect and support he received in Tamil Nadu was amazing. The hotel proprietor's in many cities and states would invite him and his disciples and host them free of cost. The top officials and leaders of the town would compete with each other to extend him a warm welcome and request him to stay at their homes.

Crowds would swell on the news of Chowdiah arriving in town. Such was Chowdiah's reputation; he had captured the hearts and minds of both ordinary listeners and knowledgeable artists and connoisseurs of carnatic music.

Seven-stringed violin

In his early years, he played the four stringed violin, and by 1927 he became an extremely well known violin accompanist. Those were the days when there was no sound amplification equipment and it was rather difficult for listeners who sat in the back rows of music halls to hear him playing the violin.

Chowdiah realised this shortcoming and launched upon increasing the sound of the violin. He improvised the violin by adding three more strings such as Tara Shadja – Mandra Shadja, Madhya Panchama – Mandra Panchama and Madhya Shadja Mandra Shadja. After practising incessantly, he began to use this new seven stringed violin in all his concerts. He experimented, innovated and practised to achieve perfection, all without the knowledge of his Guru (teacher).

In one of the vocal concerts of his Guru  Bidaram Krishnappa in Mysore, Chowdiah accompanied him using his new seven stringed violin. Krishnappa perceived the sound emanating from the violin was louder than usual. He stared at his disciple and his violin and noted that there were three additional strings. He angrily asked him '‘what is this contraption?'’ and had an outburst. Chowdiah, in all humility said that he added three more strings and evolved this seven stringed violin so that the sound of the violin could be heard even in the back rows of the concert hall. He was afraid of the Guru's outburst. Veena Seshanna who was also present in the audience, was aware of the seven stringed violin. He was pleased with  Chowdiah's accomplishment at innovating the violin, and told  Bidaram Krishnappa that Chowdiah must be allowed to play that violin. Sometime later, Chowdiah accompanied his master again in another concert using this new violin and his master was pleased with it.

Seven-stringed violin was mocked by many critics and performers as an attempt at self-promotion. GNB mocked him as 'Soundiah', though the two reconciled later and performed together. C S Iyer, brother of Nobel Laureate C V Raman, was a performer and critic. He suggested at a meet in 1942 that seven-stringed violin should be consigned to the very depths of the Bay of Bengal. An enraged Chowdiah got up and ran towards the dais brandishing his violin bow. He was restrained from bodily harming C. S. Iyer. In 1947 Chowdiah came with a 12 stringed violin to demonstrate it but he was prevailed upon by Semmangudi who was that year's conference president not to go ahead with the demonstration. All major practitioners continue to use the traditional four stringed violin only. But V Sethuramiah, Chowdiah's disciple, mostly used seven-stringed violin; and Sethuramaih's solo playing and accompaniment samples are available on the net.

Achievements
Chowdiah designed the seven-stringed violin to ensure that the accompanist could match the vocalist (the need for this was felt especially in the early and mid-20th century when no amplification devices were available). He was known as Pitilu Chowdiah – Pitilu (fiddle) being the word for violin in South Indian languages such as Kannada . As he hailed from Tirumakudalu Narasipura near Mysore, so he is also known as Mysore T. Chowdiah.

Chowdiah founded the Ayyanar College of music, in Mysore to fulfill his guru  Bidaram Krishnappa's dream of opening an institution of learning and advanced studies in music at " Prasanna Seetha Rama Mandira". Mr. K. Puttu Rao, a senior advocate of the city, was the secretary of Bidaram Krishnappa's Prasanna Seetha Rama Mandiram at that time, and he offered all the necessary support to set up the institution.  Chowdiah started the institution with his disciple  Ramarathnam as the vice-principal of Ayyanar College of Music, Mysore.

Hundreds of students have been trained in vocal, violin, veena and flute at the Ayyanar College of Music. The college also trained many blind students who were provided the Government of India scholarships. Well known students of Mysore Ramarathnam from this school include late N. Nanjunda Swamy (vocal music), late Dr B.R. Shyamachar (flute), Late C.M. Madhuranath (flute), Late T. R. Srinivasan (vocal music), Late B. Srinivasa Iyengar (veena and vocal), Late Rangaswamy Iyengar (violin), K. J. Venkatachar (vocal and violin), G. R.Jaya, Indira, Lalita, Padma and others. The students of this college were trained to appear for junior, senior, and proficiency examinations in flute, violin, veena and vocal music.  Chowdiah, the Principal often visited the college of music and would listen, observe, supervise and give suggestions to students and the administrators. 
Chowdiah composed many varnas, kirthana's and thillanas. In the early days every one had seen vidwans like Musuri Subramanya Iyer, GNB, Maharajapura Vishwanatha Iyer participate in films. Motivated by this, Chowdiah produced a movie called Vani, for which he was also the music director. Those days there was a well known dramatist Hiranniah who, acted in the film and also helped Chowdiah with lyrics and scripts for songs in the movie "Vani". The lyrics for these songs consisted of dramatic tunes and, were not of the standard for compositions in carnatic music. So, this motivated  Chowdiah to start composing. He has composed nearly 50 compositions in Sanskrit and Kannada including varna's, kirthana's and thillanas. All of these have been edited and brought out in the form of a book "Chowdiah's Compositions" by Prof. Mysore V. Ramarathnam, which were published by University of Mysore.

He was awarded the Sangeetha Kalanidhi title by Madras Music Academy in 1957. He also received the Sangeetha Kalasikhamani award conferred on him by The Indian Fine Arts Society in 1958.

To honour the memory of his Guru, he completed the Bidaram Krishnappa Rama Mandira in Mysore as Bidram Krishnappa died before realising his dream on which he had spent all his fortune.

Filmography
Vani (1943) (producer, actor, music director)

Death
Chowdiah died on 19 January 1967 at the age of 72. While he remains as a shining star in the hearts and minds of true connoisseurs' of carnatic music, his life and career and his contribution to carnatic music is alive and well throughout the world of carnatic music. The violin shaped unique architecture of Chowdiah Memorial Hall in Bangalore, India built in memory of  Chowdiah stands to represent the gigantic musical personality that personified  Chowdiah.

Legacy 
Chowdiah Memorial Hall at Bangalore, constructed with the support of the Karnataka state government in his memory in 1980, resembles a violin in shape and structure.
Sangeetha Rathna Mysore T. Chowdiah Memorial Award instituted to honour notable musicians.
A road in Bangalore is named after him as T. Chowdiah Road.
Noted Kannada film actor, former Member of Parliament and former Minister of State in the central government, Ambareesh (originally Amaranath Gowda) is Chowdiah's grandson.
 Sangeetha Kalarathna Prof. Mysore V. Ramarathnam, Retd. Principal and Professor of Vocal Music, University of Mysore, India, author and composer is one of Chowdiah's principal disciples.

References

External links 
 Brief Biography of T. Chowdaiah
 Chowdaiah's compositions (in Kannada)
Biographic sketch of Chowdiah

An article about Chowdiah Memorial Hall
 accompanying Chembai Vaidyanatha Bhagavatar with Palghat Mani Iyer on the Mridangam
A website that is dedicated to the legacy of Chowdiah and a digital archive of his compositions

1895 births
1967 deaths
Carnatic violinists
Kannada film score composers
Kannada people
20th-century Indian composers
20th-century violinists
Musicians from Mysore
Indian male composers
Male film score composers
20th-century male musicians
Recipients of the Sangeet Natak Akademi Award